Elections to the Shetland Islands Council were held on 1 May 2003 as part of Scottish local elections.  The Liberal Democrats were reduced to 5 seats, with independent candidates making gains.  Eight seats were uncontested.

Election results

Ward results

References

2003
2003 Scottish local elections